Qazi Naser al-Din Abdollah ibn Amr was a late 13th century judge and scholar of Iran. His famous work, Nezam al-Tawarikh contains an historical account of Fars Province.

References used

 E.G. Browne. Literary History of Persia. (Four volumes, 2,256 pages, and twenty-five years in the writing). 1998. 
 Jan Rypka, History of Iranian Literature. Reidel Publishing Company. ASIN B-000-6BXVT-K

See also

List of Persian poets and authors
Persian literature

Persian-language writers
Sharia judges
Iranian scholars